Captain Stanley Tucker (May 12, 1931 – June 10, 2008) was a Canadian airline pilot for Eastern Provincial Airways of Newfoundland, Canada. Tucker was the original owner of two milestones Ford Mustangs within the car's first two years of production.

Serial Number One 

Before the car officially hit the sales floor on April 17, 1964, thousands of Mustangs had already been rolling off the assembly line for the past five weeks and getting shipped out to dealerships all over. The car was one of approximately 180 pre-production cars built at the Rouge between February 10 and March 5, 1964. These initial cars served two purposes: 1.) They eased Ford into full production by familiarizing workers and supervisors with the build process, and 2.) They formed a batch of production cars that could be shipped to every major Ford dealer for the April 17 launch. Logically, the first cars built were sent to the farthest dealers – hence Serial Number One wound up 2,180 miles from Dearborn in St. John's, Newfoundland. (Twelve of these pre-production cars, incidentally, went to the New York World's Fair for use in Ford's Magic Skyway ride). Mustang Serial Number One in particular was painted Wimbledon White with serial number 5F08F100001. The first-ordered Mustang was shipped to the Ford of Canada sales district and was taken on a nationwide tour of Ford dealer showrooms all across Canada ending at George Parsons Ford, a dealership perched on the eastern edge of the continent in St. John's.

On April 13, 1964, Tucker was driving past the Ford dealer when he noticed a big crowd in the dealership on introduction day and stopped in to see what the commotion was about. By the time he finished dinner that evening, he decided that he had to have that car.

On April 14, 1964, Tucker walked into the showroom. Mr Parsons, the owner of the dealership, wanted to retain the car for a few days because it was the only Mustang he had in stock, but Capt. Tucker persuaded his young salesman, Harry Phillips, to break street date and make it available three days before April 17, when Ford officially released Mustang to the world. A deal was reached and a check was written on the spot. Tucker took serial number 5F08F100001 home and, for a short time, was the general public's only Mustang owner. At the time, he had no idea he had purchased the first Mustang ever ordered. "For a long time, I was the only Mustang owner in Newfoundland. It was quite an experience" Capt. Tucker recalled. "Many times another motorist would force me to the side of the road to ask me about the car -- what it was, who made it, how I like it and how much it cost?"

Serial Number 1,000,001 

Once it became known a couple of weeks later that Mustang Number One had been inadvertently sold, Ford officials reached out to Tucker to try to buy it back. Tucker declined the request. He spent the next two years putting some 10,000 miles on his pony car. By early 1966, when nearly one million Mustangs had been sold and the car's status as a Ford landmark was secure, the Ford Motor Company called again. This time, Ford offered Tucker a worthy trade: in exchange for returning Serial Number One, he could have the One-Millionth Mustang free of charge, equipped to his specifications. Tucker agreed and, when filling out the order, covered the entire option sheet with a single large “X”. The car was a silver frost convertible with a black top, a deluxe black interior with a wood-grain steering wheel, styled steel wheels, Cruise-O-Matic transmission, air conditioning, Philco-Ford Stereosonic 8-track tape player, disc brakes and rally pac. It even had a Philco television. The only extra he didn't take was the High Performance 289 engine – it carried a shorter warranty period.

Tucker traveled to Dearborn, Michigan, where Ford wined and dined him in the company of executives such as Lee Iacocca and Don Frey. On March 2, 1966, Tucker's loaded '66 Mustang convertible rolled off the line amid fanfare and excitement. Capt. Tucker posed for photos with his new Silver Frost 1966 Mustang convertible. Meanwhile, Ford reclaimed Tucker's much-loved Serial Number One and soon donated it to The Henry Ford where it is on display to this day.

After taking delivery of the Millionth Mustang early in 1966, Tucker pressed it into daily use in all kinds of weather, including nasty Canadian winters. The elements took their toll. Through the years, he drove the Mustang thousands of miles. He even pulled a trailer with it. By the time the 1970s came around, Tucker knew it was time to sell the Mustang and opt for something new. He sold the car to his mechanic and never saw it again.

References

Further reading 
 Associated Press, "Ford's first Mustang enshrined as 20-year success story", Morning Star, Wilmington, North Carolina. Vol. 117, No 138 (1984).
 Tom Corcoran, Mustang 1964½–1968, MBI Publishing, Osceola, Wisconsin (1993). .
 Mike Mueller, Mustang 1964½–1973, MBI Publishing, Osceola, Wisconsin (2000). .
 "Feature: Newfoundland, Captain Tucker, and the very first Mustang" Canadian Driver, 2005.
 "Capt. Stanley Tucker and His Ford Mustangs, Numbers 1 and 1 Million". The Ford Motor Company Mediacenter, 2013.
 "Capt. Stanley Tucker Owned Milestone Mustangs". Mustang360 Magazine, 2013.
 "Ford Mustang 00001 bought in St. John's 50 years ago" Canadian Broadcasting Company, 2014.
"He accidentally sold — and possibly saved — the 1st Ford Mustang ever built" USA Today, 2019.
"55 years later, the salesman who sold the first Ford Mustang built will be reunited with it" CNN, 2019.

1931 births
2008 deaths